The Covelli Centre is a multi-purpose arena in Youngstown, Ohio, United States. It opened in 2005, thanks in a large part to a $26 million HUD redevelopment grant secured in 2000 by Congressman James A. Traficant Jr. It is home to the Youngstown Phantoms of the United States Hockey League. The Covelli Centre was previously known as the Chevrolet Centre and is nicknamed "The Chevy Centre" or "The Convo" by some in the area from its former names.

History
The arena's grand opening was on October 29, 2005, when it hosted a concert by 3 Doors Down. The first hockey game was played about a week later, on November 4.

In Fall 2007, the city hired Eric Ryan Productions of nearby Struthers, to temporarily operate the arena until the city could find another company to manage the facility. SMG and Global Spectrum are the final two companies in the running to run the Chevrolet Centre. The Chevy Centre was formerly managed by the International Coliseums Company, a subsidiary of Global Entertainment, which owns the Central Hockey League. On Friday, April 4, 2008; the city of Youngstown signed a deal with Ticketmaster to become the official ticket provider of the Chevrolet Centre. The arena itself is owned by the city.

The arena, which was initially named the Convocation Center when it opened in October, was renamed a few weeks after its opening on Friday, November 18, 2005, when General Motors acquired the naming rights, and was renamed the Chevrolet Centre. Choosing Chevrolet for the naming rights was highly appropriate because one of the brand's more successful cars, the Cobalt, is manufactured in nearby Lordstown.

On October 4, 2008, it was announced that GM had decided not to renew their naming rights deal with the city.  The city was in the process of negotiating with local Chevy dealers to keep the name of the facility the same.   On Wednesday, April 30, 2009 Covelli Enterprises (a local franchisee of Panera Bread and O'Charley's restaurants), signed a 3-year, $120,000 naming-rights deal, giving the Centre its current name (a complete signing switch is expected by June 1). 

Starting in November 2008, the Mahoning Valley Phantoms of the North American Hockey League played select home games at the arena.  Upon joining the USHL, the Phantoms moved into the Covelli Centre full-time in 2009.

TBA the Covelli Centre will be getting its first non minor league sports team.  The Youngstown Nighthawks of the Major Arena Soccer League.  They are currently part of the Premier Arena Soccer League.

The Ohio Junior High wrestling championships were held at the arena.

The facility is being utilized to house the "Mercy Health Covelli Field Hospital," an additional medical space for COVID-19 patients during the COVID-19 pandemic.

Naming rights 
On April 30, 2009, Sam Covelli, owner of many Panera and O'Charley's restaurants in the area, signed a 3-year, $360,000 contract to rename the then Chevrolet Centre to the Covelli Centre. Covelli has indicated that he plans to work to more aggressively market the arena.

The arena officially took on the Covelli Centre name on June 1, 2009.

Records
The arena's first sold-out performances were on November 12, 2005, when it hosted two concerts by the Trans-Siberian Orchestra. Both 2:30 and 7:30 shows were sold out. The first sold-out hockey game was on January 14, 2006.

On March 8, 2010, it was announced that the Covelli Centre would host Elton John on May 1, 2010. The event sold out in a record time of 30 minutes on March 12, 2010, which eclipsed the previous record set by Carrie Underwood, an event that sold out in 48 hours.

Revitalization
The Covelli Centre has been at the forefront of what is hoped to be a major downtown revitalization in the city of Youngstown. The downtown economy has benefitted since its opening, primarily from guests patronizing its bars and restaurants before and after events.

The city and other private firms came to an agreement that allowed people to park for free in downtown on days when there is an event at the arena.

Selected events
October 22, 2005 - Youngstown Convocation Center open house
October 29, 2005 - 3 Doors Down, Shinedown & Alter Bridge (first event)
October 30, 2005 - Tony Bennett
November 4, 2005 - First Steelhounds game
November 12, 2005 - Trans-Siberian Orchestra (First sold-out event)
November 23, 2005 - Lil Jon
November 27, 2005 - Clay Aiken
December 28–31, 2005 - Disney on Ice
January 14, 2006 - First sold out Steelhounds game
January 19, 2006 - Larry the Cable Guy
April 4, 2006 - Korn, Mudvayne & 10 Years
April 10, 2006 - John Mellencamp
On June 30, 2006 - Slayer, Mastodon & Lamb of God were scheduled to play here. Unfortunately, the show was moved to Cleveland.
July 5, 2006 - Shinedown & Evans Blue
September 12, 2007 - Staind, Crossfade, Three Days Grace & Black Stone Cherry
On February 13, 2007 - Slayer backed out of another Youngstown show that was moved to Cleveland.
March 31, 2007 - First Mahoning Valley Thunder game
April 5, 2007 - Ludacris presented by Youngstown State University
July 1, 2007 -  Tool
July 3, 2007 - Stevie Nicks
August 7, 2007 - WWE Smackdown & ECW (Sold Out)
June 11, 2008 - Carrie Underwood, with special guest Jason Michael Carroll (Sold Out)
October 18, 2008 - "Hot Ice--Cool Sounds", Skating Show with music by Peter Cetera and the Cleveland Pops Orchestra & was shown on NBC, on December 25, 2008.
October 29, 2008 - Rock the Vote featuring Beastie Boys and Sheryl Crow
November 22, 2008 - Avenged Sevenfold, Buckcherry, Shinedown & Saving Abel.
 February 21, 2009 - Boxing: Kelly Pavlik vs. Marco Antonio Rubio (Sold Out)
May 9, 2009 - WWE "Raw Live", featuring John Cena, Batista, Big Show & Randy Orton (Sold Out)
July 25, 2009 - Last Mahoning Valley Thunder game
July 29, 2009-Pedal to The metal tour Mudvayne, Black Label Society, Static-X, Suicide Silence, Bury Your Dead
August 15, 2009 - Journey and Heart
October 8, 2009 - Jeff Dunham
October 17, 2009 - Kelly Clarkson
November 4, 2009 - Daughtry
November 12, 2009 - Gaither Vocal Band
February 2, 2010 - Shinedown, Puddle of Mudd & Skillet
March 18, 2010 - Breaking Benjamin, Chevelle, Red & Thousand Foot Krutch
May 1, 2010 - Elton John (Sold out in 30 minutes)
June 26, 2010 - WWE Raw World Tour
September 18, 2010 - Montgomery Gentry
October 9, 2010 - Rob Zombie and Alice Cooper
April 12, 2011 - Goo Goo Dolls
May 6, 2011 - Tim Mcgraw
May 22, 2011 - Lynyrd Skynyrd and ZZ Top
July 29, 2011 - Mötley Crüe and Poison
October 7, 2011 - Gaither Homecoming 2011 Tour
December 7, 2011 - Guns N' Roses, with special guest- Black Label Society (ft Zakk Wylde)
April 6, 2012 - Sugarland
December 7, 2012 - First College Basketball Game: Youngstown State University Vs. Hiram College
November 16, 2013 - Justin Moore, Randy Houser and Josh Thompson
February 1, 2014 - Elton John
22 March 2016	- Elton John (Wonderful Crazy Night Tour)
August 26, 2016 - Kiss
September 15, 2017 - Stevie Nicks
December 2, 2017 - Migos
August 5, 2018 - Rough n Rowdy 4 (boxing)
March 5, 2019 - Shinedown With Papa Roach and Asking Alexandria
May 20, 2019 - Slayer Final Tour With Lamb of God, Cannibal Corpse, and Amon Amarth
August 21, 2019 - Hall & Oates
October 10, 2019 - Ghost With Nothing More
November 27, 2019 - Five Finger Death Punch With Three Days Grace, Bad Wolves, and Fire from the Gods
December 21, 2019 - West Virginia vs. YSU Basketball
February 26, 2022 - WWE Road to Wrestlemania
September 17, 2022 - Donald Trump Save America Rally

References

External links 

Indoor ice hockey venues in Ohio
Indoor soccer venues in Ohio
Wrestling venues in Ohio
Sports venues in Ohio
Buildings and structures in Youngstown, Ohio
Tourist attractions in Youngstown, Ohio
2005 establishments in Ohio
Sports venues completed in 2005
Indoor arenas in Ohio